Whairepo Lagoon is an open public area at the centre of Wellington, New Zealand. It is a small man-made lagoon filled with sea water and connected to Wellington Harbour through a narrow channel. A split-level footbridge over the mouth of the lagoon was designed by Eastbridge. The lagoon is surrounded by The Boat Shed, City-to-Sea bridge, and the Wellington Rowing, Star Boating Club, and Te Raukura buildings. Tanya Ashken's Albatross fountain sits on the north side of the lagoon between it and Frank Kitts Park.

On 17 December 2015 the lagoon was officially named Whairepo Lagoon, as it previously had no official name. The lagoon was previously referred to as Frank Kitts Lagoon, Frank Kitts Park Lagoon or simply The Lagoon. 'Whairepo' is the Maori name for the Eagle ray which can sometimes be seen in the lagoon.

Gallery

References

External links

Wellington City
Tourist attractions in Wellington City
Wellington Harbour
Wellington Central, Wellington